The 1992 Labour Party deputy leadership election followed the Labour Party's failure to win the 1992 general election and the subsequent resignation of deputy party leader Roy Hattersley. The ballot took place on 18 July 1992 at Labour Party Conference. Affiliated organisations had 40% of the vote, while Constituency Labour Parties and the Parliamentary Labour Party had 30% each in the electoral college.

The election took place simultaneously with the 1992 Labour Party leadership election.

Candidates

 Margaret Beckett, Shadow Chief Secretary to the Treasury, Member of Parliament for Derby South
 Bryan Gould, Shadow Secretary of State for the Environment, Member of Parliament for Dagenham
 John Prescott, Shadow Secretary of State for Transport, Member of Parliament for Kingston upon Hull East

Result

See also
 1992 Labour Party leadership election
 Opinion polling for the 1997 United Kingdom general election

References

  (unofficial website)
 

Labour Party deputy leadership election
1992
Labour Party deputy leadership election